Franz Burkhard (born 25 May 1931) is a Swiss former wrestler. He competed in the men's Greco-Roman flyweight at the 1960 Summer Olympics.

References

External links
 

1931 births
Possibly living people
Swiss male sport wrestlers
Olympic wrestlers of Switzerland
Wrestlers at the 1960 Summer Olympics
People from Sursee District
Sportspeople from the canton of Lucerne